Johannes van Maaren (4 March 1890 – 6 June 1963) was a Dutch wrestler. He competed at the 1920, 1924 and 1928 Summer Olympics.

References

External links
 

1890 births
1963 deaths
Olympic wrestlers of the Netherlands
Wrestlers at the 1920 Summer Olympics
Wrestlers at the 1924 Summer Olympics
Wrestlers at the 1928 Summer Olympics
Dutch male sport wrestlers
People from Zaltbommel
Sportspeople from Gelderland